National Significant Numbers (NSN): seven digits

Format: +960 xxx xxxx

The current numbering plan was introduced in 2005.

Fixed Telephony

Mobile Telephony

Paging

Premium Rate Services

References

Maldives
Maldives communications-related lists